Andrew Ingram McGavin (January 31, 1879 – April 18, 1946) was a Canadian politician and was the mayor of Victoria, British Columbia from 1936 to 1944. He was born in Glasgow, Scotland and he died in Victoria.

References

1879 births
1946 deaths
Mayors of Victoria, British Columbia
Politicians from Glasgow